き, in hiragana, キ in katakana, is one of the Japanese kana, which each represent one mora.  Both represent  and are derived from a simplification of the  kanji. The hiragana character き, like さ, is drawn with the lower line either connected or disconnected.

A dakuten may be added to the character; this transforms it into ぎ in hiragana, ギ in katakana, and gi in Hepburn romanization.

A handakuten (゜) does not occur with ki in normal Japanese text, but it may be used by linguists to indicate a nasal pronunciation .

Stroke order

Other communicative representations

 Full Braille representation

 Computer encodings

References

See also

Specific kana